Qamar Gula (21 January 1952 – 9 December 2022) was an Afghan Canadian musician, who has been credited with being the second female Pashto language singer (after Rukhshana) to sing for the Radio Television Afghanistan. A veteran of Afghan music, she had a career that spanned nearly five decades.

Early life
Qamar Gula was born in Nangarhar Province of Afghanistan. She started singing at the age of seven or eight, and due to wide audience appreciation she was encouraged to pursue it professionally.

Career
Gula's career reached its zenith when she married Mohammad Din Zakhil who composed many of her songs. By the early 1970s, she gained fame across Afghanistan and ranked among the top female singers of the country. Her music was also heard by ethnic Pashtuns in Pakistan, particularly in what is now Khyber Pakhtunkhwa.

Gula’s music included compositions from Zakhil as well as other Afghan composers. Gula maintained her popularity among Afghans, particularly among the older generation who associated her music with the nostalgic times of Afghanistan before the civil war. Her voice was often referred to as “The Golden Voice” by the Afghan media. Over the years, she collaborated with various Afghan singers including Rukhshana in the 1970s, Gul Zaman in the 1980s, and in 2010s with Zarsanga, Waheed Qasemi, and Hangama.

Immigration to Canada
Gula immigrated to Canada due to the civil war in Afghanistan. She lived in the province of Ontario, where she continued her music career.

Death
Gula died of a prolonged illness on 9 December 2022, at the age of 70. She left behind three sons and three daughters.

Awards
Gula won many awards throughout her lifetime, including the following:
 Golden Medals: Zahir Shah, Daoud Khan, Babrak Karmal and Mohammad Najibullah
 Nightingale title: Hamid Karzai - President of Afghanistan Best Singer: Ariana Television''
 Best Singer: Afghan community of California

See also
List of Afghan singers

References

External links
  (Radio Television Afghanistan)

1952 births
2022 deaths
20th-century Afghan women singers
21st-century Afghan women singers
Afghan emigrants to Canada 
Deaths from cancer in Ontario
Pashto-language singers
Pashtun women
People from Nangarhar Province